Gady Kozma is an Israeli mathematician. Kozma obtained his PhD in 2001 at the University of Tel Aviv with Alexander Olevskii. He is a scientist at the Weizmann Institute. In 2005, he demonstrated the existence of the scaling limit value (that is, for increasingly finer lattices) of the loop-erased random walk in three dimensions and its invariance under rotations and dilations.

A loop-erased random walk consists of a random walk, whose loops, which form when it intersects itself, are removed. This was introduced to the study of self-avoiding random walk by Gregory Lawler in 1980, but is an independent model in another universality class. In the two-dimensional case, conformal invariance was proved by Lawler, Oded Schramm and Wendelin Werner (with Schramm-Loewner evolution) in 2004. The cases of four and more dimensions were treated by Lawler, the scale limiting value is Brownian motion, in four dimensions. Kozma treated the two-dimensional case in 2002 with a new method. In addition to probability theory, he also deals with Fourier series. 

In 2008 he received the Erdős Prize and in 2010 the Rollo-Davidson Prize.  He is an editor of the Journal d'Analyse Mathématique.

References 

Living people
Israeli mathematicians
Year of birth missing (living people)
Erdős Prize recipients